Cydnoides albipennis is a species of black bug in the family Thyreocoridae. It is found in North America.

References

Further reading

 
 
 
 
 
 
 

Shield bugs
Articles created by Qbugbot
Insects described in 1859